Emmanuel Lion Udemezue (born 1 January 1992) is a Nigerian footballer who played for KF Adriatiku Mamurras in the 2016–2017 season.

References

1992 births
Living people
Nigerian footballers
KF Adriatiku Mamurrasi players
Association football forwards